Niederhausbergen is a commune in the Bas-Rhin department in Grand Est in north-eastern France.

Niederhausbergen is a small residential area on the outskirts of Strasbourg, located 6 km northwest of the latter. It adjoins the hill Hausbergen, which represents the foothills of the Vosges du Nord region Kochersberg.

See also
 Communes of the Bas-Rhin department

References

Communes of Bas-Rhin
Bas-Rhin communes articles needing translation from French Wikipedia